The Langley Baronetcy, of Higham Gobion in the County of Bedford, was a title in the Baronetage of England.  It was created on 29 May 1641 for William Langley.  The title became extinct on the death of the fifth Baronet in circa 1790.

Langley baronets, of Higham Gobion (1641)
Sir William Langley, 1st Baronet (died 1653)
Sir Roger Langley, 2nd Baronet ( – 1699)
Sir Roger Langley, 3rd Baronet (died 1721)
Sir Thomas Langley, 4th Baronet (died 1762)
Sir Haldanby Langley, 5th Baronet (died c. 1790)

References

Extinct baronetcies in the Baronetage of England